Bransbury Common is a  biological Site of Special Scientific Interest south-east of Andover in Hampshire. It is a Nature Conservation Review site, Grade I. 

This site has two different habitats. The soil of the common is peat over gravel, and the dominant plants are purple moor-grass and greater tussock-sedge. There is also a former water meadow, which has flowering plants including lady's smock, marsh marigold and early marsh-orchid.

References

 
Sites of Special Scientific Interest in Hampshire
Nature Conservation Review sites